Mighty High is the eighth studio album by southern rock jam band Gov't Mule. The album was released on October 16, 2007, by ATO Records. Mighty High features reggae and dub versions of classic Mule covers and originals with special guest appearances by reggae legends Michael Franti, Toots Hibbert, and Willi Williams. Most tracks on Mighty High were recorded in the studio but a few of the songs are remixed dubstyle from live recordings at the Beacon Theatre, Bonnaroo, and Mountain Jam. Although the album was not well received among Mule fans, it opened the doors to many reggae fans to their music.

Track listing

Personnel
 Warren Haynes - guitar, vocals, production
 Matt Abts - drums, percussion
 Danny Louis - keyboards, guitar, background vocals
Pamela Fleming - trumpet
 Andy Hess - bass
 Gordie Johnson - production, mixing, guitar

References

External links

2007 albums
ATO Records albums
Gov't Mule albums